First Kill is a 2017 American action thriller film directed by Steven C. Miller and written by Nick Gordon. The film stars Hayden Christensen and Bruce Willis.

Plot
Wall Street broker Will Beeman (Hayden Christensen) has been struggling with being present for his wife Laura (Megan Leonard) and son Danny (Ty Shelton). Shortly after hearing of Danny being bullied at school, Will decides to take his family to his hometown, Granville, Ohio to bond with Danny. Upon entering Granville, Will is reacquainted with Police Chief Marvin Howell (Bruce Willis), a family friend who knew Will's father and at one point dated his aunt, Dottie (Deb G. Girdler). Howell advises Will on taking precaution after informing him of a recent bank robbery where a couple of million dollars was stolen. While teaching Danny how to hunt with a rifle, Will and Danny witness a heated exchange between two men, one of them holding the other at gunpoint, inquiring after money drop-off not going according to plan. The unarmed man (Gethin Anthony) is shot in the shoulder after throwing a key near Will's position at a shooting station; Danny's shocked gasp at the shooting attracts the gunman's attention. The gunman opens fire on Will's location, prompting Will, fearing for his son's safety, to shoot him with his hunting rifle in self-defense. Upon inspecting the dead gunman, he's surprised to discover a concealed badge and that the gunman was a police officer who failed to identify himself. Distraught, Will brings the wounded man to the family cabin for Laura, a surgeon, to provide first aid and hopefully save the only other witness to the proceedings.

Shortly after being treated and bandaged up, on regaining consciousness, the man takes Danny hostage at knife-point, demanding that Will help him retrieve the discarded key in exchange for Danny's freedom. While attempting to retrieve the key back at the shooting shack, they're surprised by a uniformed officer, Richie Stechel (William DeMeo), who opens fire on Will and the gunman. The gunman tells Will to meet him at a bulletin board after retrieving the key, then absconds with Will's car and son as hostage. After a failed attempt at pursuing his son, Will learns from Howell that the gunman's name is Levi Barrett, and that the deceased officer was Richie's brother, Charlie (Shea Buckner). Will waits until nightfall to retrieve the key, only to be confronted by Richie. Will successfully subdues Richie, leaving him handcuffed to a tree, then heads to the bulletin board for further instructions. Meanwhile, Danny bonds with Levi and learns the reasons behind the bank robbery. Howell and the Stechel brothers engineered the heist and intended to use Levi as the fall guy. Levi agreed to the heist in order to financially support Mabel Fantion (Christine Dye), his girlfriend Adele's (Magi Avila) cancer-ridden mother. Levi was supposed to drop off the stolen money at a drop-site, but suspecting the cops would likely betray him, did not arrive due to fear of the site being compromised with a potential assassin. Howell also deduces Levi's predicament after a uniformed officer investigates Barrett's apartment.

Howell and Will converge on Mabel's hospital bed, with Howell questioning Will's motivation for being there. While Howell is distracted with a radio call by an officer, Will receives a map from Mabel revealing the location of the post office where the stolen money was stashed and the location of an underground bunker at which to make the exchange for his son. The key is used to unlock the mailbox containing the stolen cash. Will briefly eludes Howell but is caught again after retrieving the money. Seemingly sympathetic to Will's situation, Howell provides Will transport to the bunker in order to apprehend Levi. Will gives the money to Levi and is reunited with Danny. Simultaneous to this reunion, Richie kidnaps Laura from the family cabin and drives her to Howell's location for leverage of their own.

While attempting to flee, Adele is murdered by Howell. Left with nothing to lose, Levi attacks Howell and Richie only to be wounded. Will takes Danny to a hunter's watchtower, where Danny soon after pushes a pursuing Richie off a high ladder to knock him out (due to following good anti-bullying advice Levi imparted to him previously while bonding over computer games). Howell holds Laura at gunpoint, threatening to shoot her if Will doesn't hand over the money. Desperate to help his parents, Danny retrieves a pistol from the unconscious Richie and attempts to shoot Howell, only for Will to stop him. In an attempt to taunt Will, Howell reveals himself as the person that murdered Will's father years earlier. Levi distracts Howell while Laura ducks, providing Will the opportunity to shoot Howell in the head.

During the aftermath, Levi dies of his injuries, much to Danny's sadness. Richie is questioned by the rest of the police department, and Mabel is found dead on the hospital bed, having been murdered by Howell by removing her life support system. As the remaining non-corrupt officers boast on news media over the recovered loot, the Beeman family relinquish their hunting rifle and decide to return home to deal with their daily lives.

Cast 
 Hayden Christensen as William "Will" Beeman
 Bruce Willis as Police Chief Marvin Howell
 Ty Shelton as Danny Beeman
 Gethin Anthony as Levi Barrett
 Megan Leonard as Laura Beeman
 Tyler Jon Olson as Officer Tom Davies
 Jesse Pruett as Officer Lewis
 Shea Buckner as Charlie Stechel
 William DeMeo as Richie Stechel
 Magi Avila as Adele Fantion
 Chris R Moss as Officer Cox
 Chelsea Mee as Tammy
 Deb G. Girdler as Aunt Dottie
 Christine Dye as Mabel Fantion

Production 
Principal photography on the film began in August 2016 in Granville, Ohio.

Box office
As of November 11, 2022, First Kill grossed $347,295 in the United Arab Emirates, Turkey, Portugal, South Africa, Argentina, Uruguay, and Paraguay, on a budget of $10 million.

Reception
On Rotten Tomatoes the film holds an approval rating of 15% based on 20 reviews, with an average rating of 3.8/10. On Metacritic the film has a weighted average score of 39 out of 100, based on seven critics, indicating "generally unfavorable reviews".

See also
 Bruce Willis filmography

References

External links 
 

2017 films
2017 independent films
American action thriller films
2017 action thriller films
Films shot in Ohio
Brookstreet Pictures films
MoviePass Films films
Lionsgate films
Films directed by Steven C. Miller
2010s English-language films
2010s American films